The Pakistan Army Corps of Electrical and Mechanical Engineers (Urdu: ﺁرمي اليكڑ يكل و ميكينكل انجينيرينگ كور; Army Electrical and Mechanical Engineers Corps, abbreviated as EME, is an active military administrative Combatant staff corps, and one of the major science and technology command of Pakistan Army.   The Corps major objective tasks are the maintenance, services, inspections, and repairing of almost every electrical and mechanical battlefield vehicles, electronic gadgets, tanks, military aviation vehicles, and researching and developing heavy mechanical projects for Pakistan Army.

It came into existence on 1942 as Royal Electrical and Mechanical Engineers (REME), and was made responsible for inspecting equipments of Royal Army Ordnance Corps and Royal Army Service Corps. The Corps became an initial part of Indian Army Corps of Engineers in May 1943. However, the Corps could not participate in any conflict in World War II, and the element of EME was integrated in Indian Army by the British Government.

In 1947, small engineering units formed what was then known as Pakistan EME, but was officially given commission in 1957 as EME, with only 20 officers were part of the Corps. In order to produce the officers and personnel, the College of Electrical and Mechanical Engineering (CEME) was established. All of the personnel and officers are sent to CEME before starting their active duty in the Corps. In 1959, its objectives were expanded it was asked to repair and maintained the aerospace equipments of PAF, Navy and Marines, though the services later established their own units. As for its war capabilities, the Corps took participation in 1965 war, 1971 war, 1999 war, 2001 standoff with India, and the recent operations. In 1960, an airborne course was established in the EME, making it mandatory for its officers and personnel to complete the parachute course. The Corps has the oldest active parachutist in the country. Since 1969, its infrastructure extensively grew in means of personnel and the equipments and since then, the Corps has produced many distinguished officers.

Units 
 3 Technical Training Battalion EME
 4 Technical Training Battalion EME
 10 Electrical & Mechanical Engineering Battalion
 42 EME Battalion
 43 EME Battalion
 44 EME Battalion
 47 EME Battalion
 49 EME Battalion
 50 EME Battalion
 58 EME Battalion
 59 EME Battalion
 70 EME Battalion
 90 EME Battalion
 94 EME Battalion
 95 EME Battalion
 118 EME Battalion
 544 Heavy EME Battalion
 546 EME Battalion
 699 Aviation EME Battalion

Notable EME officers

Lieutenant-General Talat Masood
Major General Sayed Saeed Akhtar
Lieutenant-General Saeed Qadir
Lieutenant-General Sabeeh Qamar Uz Zaman
Lieutenant-General Tanvir Tahir
Major-General Ahmad Sharif  DG ISPR
Major-General Syed Ali Nawab
Major General Dr. Mauzzam Ali Goraya
Major General Muhammad Asaad, HI(M)
Brig Ghazanfar Abbas

References

Media gallery

E
E
E
E